The 2018–19 season of the Ukrainian Championship Higher League is the 28th season of Ukraine's top women's football league. It runs from 3 August 2018 to 1 June 2019.

Teams

Team changes

Name changes
 Iednist-ShVSM Plysky was known last season as Iednist Plysky (merged with Lehenda-ShVSM)

Stadiums
{| class="wikitable sortable"
|-
! Team
! Home city
! Home ground
! Capacity
|-
| data-sort-value="Iatran" | Iatran || Uman Raion || Tsentralnyi Raionyi Stadion || 1,600
|-
| data-sort-value="Iednist" | Iednist || Plysky || Iednist Stadion || 1,500
|-
| data-sort-value="Ladomyr" | Ladomyr || Volodymyr-Volynskyi || Olimp Stadion || 2,000+<ref>Volodymyr Krupchuk, Sofia Tkachuk. Provincial stadiums of Ukraine: "Olimp" in the Duchy's capital (Провінційні стадіони України: "Олімп" у столиці князівства). Depo Sector. 26 June 2016</ref>
|-
| data-sort-value="Lviv" | Lviv || Novoiavorivsk || Stadion imeni Rusyna || 
|-
| data-sort-value="Pantery" | Pantery || Uman|| Stadion Umanfermmash || 
|-
| data-sort-value="Dnipro-1" | Zlahoda-Dnipro-1 || Dnipro || Molodizhnyi Stadion || 
|-
| data-sort-value="Rodyna" | Rodyna || Berezne|| Stadion Kolos || 3,000
|-
| data-sort-value="Voskhod" | Voskhod || Beryslav || Stadion Mashynobudivnyk || 
|-
| data-sort-value="Zhytlobud-1" | Zhytlobud-1 || Liubotyn || Stadion Olimpiyets || 
|-
| data-sort-value="Zhytlobud-2" | Zhytlobud-2 || Kharkiv || Sonyachny Stadium || 4,924
|}

Vyshcha Liha

Results

Top scorers

Relegation play-offs
The drawing for relegation playoff took place on 13 June 2019.

Zlahoda-Dnipro-1 won on walkover and has preserved its berth in the Ukrainian Women's League. SC Vyshneve withdrew from league competitions. Later SC Dnipro-1 informed the Ukrainian Association of Football that it will not field its female team next season.

Persha Liha
Group A

Group B

Play-offs
SemifinalsVO DYuSSh Vinnytsia and Mariupolchanka Mariupol gained promotion to the Ukrainian Women's League.Third placeSC Vyshneve qualified for promotion/relegation play-offs.FinalMariupolchanka Mariupol was crown as the champions of the 2018–19 Persha Liha.''

Notes

References

External links
WFPL.ua
Women's Football.ua

2018-19
2018–19 in Ukrainian association football leagues